Koran Dunbar  is an American actor, director, screenwriter, and comedian. His recent work is Greencastle, where Dunbar is the writer, director, and lead actor.

Early life
Dunbar is originally from Hartford, Connecticut, and moved to Greencastle, Pennsylvania when he was a child with his grandparents, Elmer Dunbar and the late Ellen Dunbar.

Filmography

Film work

References

External links
 

American male actors
Living people
People from Franklin County, Pennsylvania
Film directors from Pennsylvania
Year of birth missing (living people)